Hyacinthoides  is a genus of flowering plants in the family Asparagaceae, known as bluebells.

Systematics
Hyacinthoides is classified in the subfamily Scilloideae (now part of the family Asparagaceae, but formerly treated as a separate family, called Hyacinthaceae), alongside genera such as Scilla and Ornithogalum. Hyacinthoides is differentiated from these other genera by the presence of two bracts at the base of each flower, rather than one bract per flower or no bracts in the other genera.

Species
According to the World Checklist of Selected Plant Families , the genus contains 11 species and one interspecific hybrid. The majority of species are distributed around the Mediterranean Basin, with only one species, Hyacinthoides non-scripta (the familiar spring flower of bluebell woods in the British Isles and elsewhere) occurring further north in north-western Europe. Hyacinthoides species belong, according to analysis using molecular phylogenetics, to three groups.

non-scripta–hispanica group
Hyacinthoides cedretorum (Pomel) Dobignard – Morocco to north Algeria
Hyacinthoides hispanica (Mill.) Rothm. (Spanish bluebell) – Portugal to west and south Spain
Hyacinthoides non-scripta (L.) Chouard ex Rothm. (common bluebell) – western Europe to northern Portugal
Hyacinthoides paivae S.Ortiz & Rodr.Oubiña – north-west Spain to north-west Portugal
Hyacinthoides × massartiana Geerinck – hybrid between H. hispanica and H. non-scripta, occurs in north-west Spain and elsewhere in Europe, including Great Britain

mauritanica group
Hyacinthoides flahaultiana (Emb.) Dobignard – south-west Morocco
Hyacinthoides mauritanica (Schousb.) Speta – south-west Portugal, north Morocco
Hyacinthoides reverchonii (Degen & Hervier) Speta – Spain (Sierra de Cazorla)

italica group
Hyacinthoides aristidis (Coss.) Rothm. – Algeria to Tunisia
Hyacinthoides ciliolata (Pomel) Rumsey – north-east Tunisia
Hyacinthoides italica (L.) Rothm. (Italian bluebell) – south-east France to north-west Italy
Hyacinthoides lingulata (Poir.) Rothm. – north-west Africa

References

External links

 
Asparagaceae genera